Hello! I'm a Producer of Woody Allen is a 2016 short film.

Cast 

 Marina Orlova - Christina
 Rodolfo Corsato - Rodolfo
 Pino Ammendola - Restaurant Manager

References

External links 

2016 films
2016 comedy films
Italian short films
Italian comedy films
2016 short films
2010s English-language films
2010s Italian films